The Picto chair is a swivel chair created by Wilkhahn and designed by Burkhard Schmitz and Franz Biggel. It is created from recyclable and CFC free materials and received the environmental seal from the Dutch  in 1995.

The chair can be disassembled and upto 95% of it can be used for individual parts, or reuse, and materials recycling. Design features of the chair which speed up the disassembly process are:
Detachable cloth covers 
Parts are mechanically joined without glue
Plastic parts weighing more than 15g are marked for identification

In terms of material selection, the chair is made from:
Polypropylene
High-pressure secondary Aluminum
PUR-foam produced without CFCs
Beech wood from renewable sources
Pigments that do not contain heavy metals

References

Chairs
Individual models of furniture